Beesd is a railway station in Beesd. Netherlands. The station opened on 1 December 1883. It lies about 2 km north of Beesd itself. The station is located on the railway line between Dordrecht and Geldermalsen (MerwedeLingelijn). The station has a small island platform, and two tracks, but only one of the tracks is actively used. Train services were operated by Arriva until 8 December 2018, when Qbuzz took over services.

Train services

Bus services

External links
Arriva website 
Dutch Public Transport journey planner 

Railway stations in Gelderland
Railway stations opened in 1883
Railway stations on the Merwede-Lingelijn
1883 establishments in the Netherlands
West Betuwe
Railway stations in the Netherlands opened in the 19th century